The Vijay for Best Art Director is given by STAR Vijay as part of its annual Vijay Awards ceremony for Tamil  (Kollywood) films.

The list
Here is a list of the award winners and the films for which they won.

Nominations 
2007 Thotta Tharani - Sivaji
Jackson - Paruthiveeran
Kathir - Pokkiri
Milan - Billa
Saikumar - Polladhavan
2008 Samir Chanda, Prabhaharan & Thotta Tharani - Dasavathaaram
Rajeevan - - Vaaranam Aayiram
Rembon - Subramaniapuram
Videsh - Saroja
2009 Vairabalan - Pokkisham
Rajeevan - Ayan and Aadhavan
Sabu Cyril - Kanchivaram
Samir Chanda - Yavarum Nalam
Thotta Tharani - Kanthaswamy
2010 Selvakumar - Madrasapattinam
Muthuraj - Irumbukkottai Murattu Singam
Videsh - Naan Mahaan Alla
Sabu Cyril - Enthiran
T. Santhanam - Aayirathil Oruvan
 2011 Seenu - Vaagai Sooda Vaa
 Rajeevan - 7aum Arivu
  Videsh -  Aaranya Kaandam
 Jackson - Aadukalam
 Kathir - Payanam
 2012 R. K. Vijay Murugan - Aravaan
 Muthuraj - Nanban
 Rajeevan - Maattrraan
 Sunil Babu - Thuppakki
 Vairabalan - Kumki
 2013 Lalgudi N. Ilaiyaraja & Thor - Vishwaroopam
 C. S. Balachandar - Paradesi
 T. Muthuraj - Raja Rani
 Rajeevan - Pandiya Naadu
 Selvakumar - Vanakkam Chennai
 2014 Sabu Cyril - Lingaa

See also
 Tamil cinema
 Cinema of India

References

Art Director